Voruta may refer to:

 Voruta, purported historical capital of Lithuania
 Voruta (newspaper), Lithuanian historical weekly newspaper
 Voruta, a traditional dance troupe at Vilnius College
 Voruta, a simple data access framework for Java